Nude is an American rock band, based in La Habra, California, United States. They formed in 2004 in Hollywood, with Swedish singer and guitarist Tony Karlsson, drummer Bobby Amaro, and original bassist Kevin Brown. They are at the moment unsigned, having previously released 3 full length albums and 1 extended play record.  Their most recent studio album, Fearless Generation, was released in February 2011.

History

2004–2011
Nude formed in the Los Angeles County city Hollywood in 2004. They met at the Musicians Institute in Hollywood.

2009–2011 and Fearless Generation
They started writing their latest album "Fearless Generation" late 2009. Tony Karlsson and Bobby Amaro were in the studio day and night for many months at the time. "Fearless Generation" was released February 10, 2011.

Band members

Current members
Tony Karlsson: Lead Vocals/Guitar  (2004–present)
Bobby Amaro: Drums/Vocals (1995–present)
Dave Mattera: Bass guitar/Vocals (2010–present)

Former members
Kevin Brown: Bass guitar (2004–2007)
Bryce Martin: Bass guitar (2007–2009)

Studio albums
 Sunshine Baby (2005)
 Pink Noise (2007)
 Fearless Generation (2011)

Music videos
 2005 "You"
 2007 "We Can Get Into This"

References

Alternative rock groups from California
Musical groups from Los Angeles
Musical groups from Orange County, California
La Habra, California
Musical groups established in 2004
Indie rock musical groups from California